Adrienne Janic, sometimes credited simply as AJ, is an American actress and television host.

Career and life
She has primarily worked as a television host including as a co-host of TLC's Overhaulin', an automotive, reality-television series.  She was also a host of Hot Import Nights (2008), an automotive show on the Speed Channel. On 12 September 2015, it was announced that she and Mike Phillips of Autogeek will host a new Velocity TV show Competition Ready.

She has appeared in several films including appearing as an Supporting role (actor) in the film National Lampoon's Cattle Call (2006). From 2004 to 2006, Janic was one of the Fantanas, a group of promotional models that was created to promote Fanta brand of soft drinks in the U.S. In 2009 she was a Co-hostess, with Tinker Keck (as Ty 'Tinker' Keck), of an infomercial for the "AbRocket" Fat Blasting System.

Janic is of Serbian and Mexican descent. She is married to Bud Brutsman, a video producer and television producer.

Filmography

Film

Television

Appearances as self

References

External links

American film actresses
American television actresses
Television personalities from California
American women television personalities
American people of Serbian descent
American actresses of Mexican descent
Living people
Actors from Whittier, California
21st-century American women
Year of birth missing (living people)